Paul M. Leonardi was the Duca Family Professor of Technology Management at the University of California, Santa Barbara. He was also the Investment Group of Santa Barbara Founding Director of the Master of Technology Management Program. Leonardi moved to UCSB to found the Technology Management Program and start its Master of Technology Management and Ph.D. programs. Before joining UCSB, Leonardi was a faculty member in the School of Communication, the McCormick School of Engineering, and the Kellogg School of Management at Northwestern University.

Leonardi’s research focuses on how companies can design their organizational networks and implement new technologies to more effectively create and share knowledge. He was particularly interested in how data intensive technologies, such as simulation and social media tools, enable new ways to access, store, and share information; how the new sources of information these technologies provide can change work routines and communication partners; and how shifts in employees’ work and communication alter the nature of an organization's expertise. His work on these topics cuts across the fields of Organization Studies, Communication Studies, and Information Systems and has been published in leading journals in these fields, such as Academy of Management Journal, Academy of Management Review, Journal of Communication, Human Communication Research, Information Systems Research,  MIS Quarterly, and Organization Science. He was also the author of three books Car Crashes Without Cars: Lessons About Simulation Technology and Organizational Change from Automotive Design (2012, MIT Press), Materiality and Organizing: Social Interaction in a Technological World(2012, Oxford University Press), and Technology Choices: Why Occupations Differ in Their Embrace of New Technologies (2015, MIT Press).

He won awards for his research from the Academy of Management, American Sociological Association, International Communication Association, National Communication Association, and Association for Information Systems

Over the past decade, he consulted with for-profit and non-profit organizations about how to manage the human aspects of new technology implementation. His recent engagements have focused on helping companies to improve communication between departments, to use social technologies to enhance internal knowledge sharing, and to strengthen global product development operations.

Published works

Young, L. E., & Leonardi, P. M. (2012). Social Issue Emergence on the Web: A Dual Structurational Model. Journal of Computer-Mediated Communication, 17, 231-246.	
Contractor, N. S., Monge, P. R., & Leonardi, P. M. (2011). Multidimensional Networks and the Dynamics of Sociomateriality: Bringing Technology Inside the Network. International Journal of Communication, 5, 682-720.
Leonardi, P. M. (2011). When Flexible Routines Meet Flexible Technologies: Affordance, Constraint, and the Imbrication of Human and Material Agencies. MIS Quarterly, 35(1), 147-167.
Leonardi, P. M. (2011). Innovation Blindness: Culture, Frames, and Cross-Boundary Problem Construction in The Development of New Technology Concepts. Organization Science, 22(2), 347-369.

Leonardi, P. M. (2010). Digital Materiality? How Artifacts Without Matter, Matter. First Monday, 15(6), Available from: https://firstmonday.org/article/view/3036/2567

All papers are available from the Leonardi's website for academic use only at

References

External links
 https://web.archive.org/web/20150518080834/http://www.tmp.ucsb.edu/files/leonardi/CV.Leonardi.pdf
 http://paulleonardi.com/
 http://www.tmp.ucsb.edu/leonardi

Living people
British business theorists
Northwestern University faculty
Stanford University alumni
Science and technology studies scholars
Information systems researchers
Year of birth missing (living people)